Harold Knutson (October 20, 1880 – August 21, 1953) was an American politician and journalist, who represented Minnesota in the United States House of Representatives from 1917 to 1949 as a member of the Republican Party. From 1919 to 1923 he was the Republican majority whip.

Early life
Knutson was born in Skien, in Telemark county, Norway. At the age of 6 he and his family moved to the United States. They initially settled in Chicago, Illinois, but later moved to Sherburne County, Minnesota.

Journalist career
Knutson became the editor for the St. Cloud Daily Journal-Press. Later, he was president of the Northern Minnesota Editorial Association.

U.S. House of Representatives
From 1917 to 1949 he served as a Republican Party Congressman in the 65th, 66th, 67th, 68th, 69th, 70th, 71st, 72nd, 73rd, 74th, 75th, 76th, 77th, 78th, 79th, and 80th congresses. On April 5, 1917, he voted against declaring war on Germany. He served as the majority whip from 1919 to 1923.  From 1947 to 1949 he headed the House Ways and Means Committee. Knutson was a leading isolationist. He was known for being overtly sympathetic to Nazi Germany, and even after Pearl Harbor he gave an address that was condemned as "defeatist." Nazi Germany described him as "an asset" for the Nazi cause in their own documents.

Later life
Knutson was defeated for re-election in 1948 and returned to editing, which he continued to do until his death in Wadena, Minnesota in 1953.

Personal life
Knutson was a Lutheran. Camp Knutson (Cross Lake, Minnesota) is an accepting and nurturing camp environment for children with special needs. The camp was donated in 1953 by Minnesota Congressman Harold Knutson to be used as a summer retreat for "neglected, unfortunate, deprived and handicapped children."  For over 50 years, thousands of children have taken part in the summer programs offered at Camp Knutson. Over the years, others who have been touched by Harold Knutson's vision continue to support, sustain and improve Camp Knutson for the future.

Knutson was a member of the Freemasons, the Benevolent and Protective Order of Elks, and the Independent Order of Odd Fellows.

Legacy
Knutson Dam on the Mississippi River at Cass Lake is named after him.

References

External links
Bioguide
Ways and Means Profile
Camp Knutson

Additional Resources 
 The   Papers of Harold Knutson are available for research use at the Minnesota Historical Society.

American Lutherans
1880 births
1953 deaths
Norwegian emigrants to the United States
People from Telemark
Politicians from Skien
American newspaper editors
Republican Party members of the United States House of Representatives from Minnesota
20th-century American politicians
20th-century Lutherans